Aloe wilsonii is a species of Aloe from northern Uganda and northwestern Kenya. It grows on rocky slopes at altitudes between 1500 and 3000 m. The species was first formally described by the botanist Gilbert Westacott Reynolds in 1956.

References

External links
Aloe wilsonii at Plants of the World Online
Aloe wilsonii The National Gardening Association

 

wilsonii